Homeric Greek is the form of the Greek language that was used in the Iliad, Odyssey, and Homeric Hymns. It is a literary dialect of Ancient Greek consisting mainly of Ionic, with some Aeolic forms, a few from Arcadocypriot, and a written form influenced by Attic. It was later named Epic Greek because it was used as the language of epic poetry, typically in dactylic hexameter, by poets such as Hesiod and Theognis of Megara. Compositions in Epic Greek may date from as late as the 5th century CE, and it only fell out of use by the end of Classical antiquity.

Main features
In the following description, only forms that differ from those of later Greek are discussed. Omitted forms can usually be predicted from patterns seen in Ionic Greek.

Phonology

Exceptions include nouns like  ("a goddess"), and the genitive plural of first-declension nouns and the genitive singular of masculine first-declension nouns.

Nouns 
 First declension
However,  and some names end in long .
 Some masculine nouns have a nominative singular in short  rather than :  for Attic .

 Second declension
 Third declension
 Homeric Greek lacks the quantitative metathesis present in later Greek (except in certain masculine α-stem genitive singulars):
  instead of 
  instead of 
  instead of 
 Homeric Greek sometimes uses different endings:
  alternates with 

A note on nouns:
This can be of metrical use.
 A relic of the Proto-Greek instrumental case, the ending (ν) ((ν)) can be used for the dative singular and plural of nouns and adjectives (occasionally for the genitive singular and plural, as well).

Pronouns 

 Third-person singular pronoun ("he, she, it") (the relative) or rarely singular article ("the"): 
 Third-person plural pronoun ("they") (the relative) or rarely plural article ("the"): nominative , dative .

Verbs
 Person endings

 Tenses
 Future: Generally remains uncontracted.
 Present or imperfect: These tenses sometimes take iterative form with the suffix  before the ending. For example, : 'they kept on running away'
 Aorist or imperfect: Both tenses can occasionally drop their augments.
 Homeric Greek does not have a historical present tense, but rather uses injunctives. Injunctives are replaced by the historical present in the post-Homeric writings of Thucydides and Herodotus.
 Subjunctive
 The subjunctive appears with a short vowel.
 The third singular active subjunctive ends in (ν).
 Occasionally, the subjunctive is used in place of the future and in general remarks.

 Infinitive

 Contracted verbs
For example, Attic  becomes .

Adverbs
 Adverbial suffixes
  conveys a sense of 'to where';  'to the war'
  conveys a sense of 'how';  'with cries'
  conveys a sense of 'from where';  'from above'
  conveys a sense of 'where';  'on high'

Particles
   'so' or 'next' (transition)
   'and' (a general remark or a connective)

 Emphatics
  'indeed'
   'surely'
  'just' or 'even'
  'I tell you ...' (assertion)

Other features
In most circumstances, Homeric Greek did not have available a true definite article.

Vocabulary
Homer (in the Iliad and the Odyssey) uses about 9,000 words, of which 1,382 are proper names. Of the 7,618 remaining words 2,307 are hapax legomena. According to classical scholar Clyde Pharr, "the Iliad has 1097 hapax legomena, while the Odyssey has 868". Others have defined the term differently, however, and count as few as 303 in the Iliad and 191 in the Odyssey.

Sample
The Iliad, lines 1–7
Μῆνιν ἄειδε, θεά, Πηληϊάδεω Ἀχιλῆος
οὐλομένην, ἣ μυρί’ Ἀχαιοῖς ἄλγε’ ἔθηκε,
πολλὰς δ’ ἰφθίμους ψυχὰς Ἄϊδι προΐαψεν
ἡρώων, αὐτοὺς δὲ ἑλώρια τεῦχε κύνεσσιν
οἰωνοῖσί τε δαῖτα· Διὸς δ’ ἐτελείετο βουλή·
ἐξ οὗ δὴ τὰ πρῶτα διαστήτην ἐρίσαντε
Ἀτρεΐδης τε ἄναξ ἀνδρῶν καὶ δῖος Ἀχιλλεύς.

Theodore Alois Buckley (1860):
Sing, O goddess, the destructive wrath of Achilles, son of Peleus, which brought countless woes upon the Greeks, and hurled many valiant souls of heroes down to Hades, and made themselves a prey to dogs and to all birds but the will of Jove was being accomplished, from the time when Atrides, king of men, and noble Achilles, first contending, were disunited.

Authors
 Homer
 Hesiod
 Theognis of Megara
 Apollonius Rhodius
 Quintus Smyrnaeus
 Nonnus
 Author(s) of the Homeric Hymns

Poets of the Epic Cycle
 Stasinus
 Arctinus of Miletus
 Lesches
 Agias
 Eumelus of Corinth
 Eugammon of Cyrene
 Musaeus of Athens

See also

 Ancient Greek dialects
 Homer's works
 Hesiod's works

Notes

References

Bibliography
 Pharr, Clyde.  Homeric Greek: A Book for Beginners.  University of Oklahoma Press, Norman, new edition, 1959. Revised edition: John Wright, 1985.  . First edition of 1920 in public domain.

Further reading

Bakker, Egbert J., ed. 2010. A companion to the Ancient Greek language. Oxford: Wiley-Blackwell.
Christidis, Anastasios-Phoivos, ed. 2007. A history of Ancient Greek: From the beginnings to Late Antiquity. Cambridge, UK: Cambridge University Press.
Colvin, Stephen C. 2007. A historical Greek reader: Mycenaean to the koiné. Oxford: Oxford University Press.
Edwards, G. Patrick. 1971. The language of Hesiod in its traditional context. Oxford: Blackwell.
Hackstein, Olav. 2010. "The Greek of epic." In A companion to the Ancient Greek language. Edited by Egbert J. Bakker, 401–23. Oxford: Wiley-Blackwell.
Horrocks, Geoffrey C. 1987. "The Ionian epic tradition: Was there an Aeolic phase in its development?" Minos 20–22: 269–94.
––––. 2010. Greek: A history of the language and its speakers. 2nd ed. Oxford: Wiley-Blackwell.
Janko, Richard. 1982. Homer, Hesiod, and the Hymns: Diachronic development in epic diction. Cambridge, UK: Cambridge University Press.
––––. 1992. "The origins and evolution of the Epic diction." In The Iliad: A commentary. Vol. 4, Books 13–16. Edited by Richard Janko, 8–19. Cambridge, UK: Cambridge University Press.
Lord, Albert B. 1960. The singer of tales. Cambridge, MA: Harvard University Press.
Nagy, Gregory. 1995. "An evolutionary model for the making of Homeric poetry: Comparative perspectives." In The ages of Homer. Edited by Jane Burr Carter and Sarah Morris, 163–79. Austin: University of Texas Press.
Palmer, Leonard R. 1980. The Greek language. London: Faber & Faber.
Parry, Milman. 1971. The making of Homeric verse: The collected papers of Milman Parry. Edited by Adam Parry. Oxford: Clarendon.
Reece, Steve. 2009. Homer's Winged Words: the Evolution of Early Greek Epic Diction in the Light of Oral Theory. Amsterdam: Brill. 
West, Martin L. 1988. "The rise of the Greek epic." Journal of Hellenic Studies 108: 151–72.

 
Varieties of Ancient Greek